Marha may refer to:

 Josef Marha (born 1976, Havlíčkův Brod), a Czech professional ice hockey player
 Māra

See also 
 Mahra (disambiguation)

Czech-language surnames